Majestic International Cruises, also known as Majestic Cruises, is a Greek owned cruise line that is based in Glyfada, a suburb of Athens located in Greece. The company was founded in the late 1980s and has expanded operations to throughout Europe and the Mediterranean Sea. Currently the cruise liner operated its main ship, the Ocean Majesty, in main scheduled operations.

History

Late 1980s through 1990s 
The Majestic International Cruises group was founded in the late 1980s by a group interested in commercial production and cruising. By 1994, the cruise liner purchased its first ship, the Ocean Majesty, which had seen a major re-construction prior to its service converting from a ferry to a cruise liner. By 1998, a second ship was adopted to the fleet which was renamed to the SS Ocean Explorer I, which serviced as a hotel ship for the 1998 Expo 98 in Lisbon, Portugal.

2000s 
As Majestic gained momentum, the group bought their third ship in 2002 which was renamed to the Ocean Monarch. The ship had previously serviced the European continent. In 2004, the SS Ocean Explorer I was laid up and sold to an Indian scrap yard. Later in 2004, Majestic sent its Ocean Monarch to aid as a hospital ship during the relief efforts of the tsunami victims during the 2004 Indian Ocean earthquake.

2010s 
On November 30, 2013, the Ocean Countess went ablaze off the coast of Greece after a fire broke out on the passenger Deck 5. At the time, the ship was laid in port following the termination of its charter from Cruise & Maritime Voyages and only had five crew members aboard, all of which survived. The ship sustained major damage and was subsequently sold to a scrap yard in Aliağa, Turkey in 2014.

On September 17, 2014, Majestic's Ocean Majesty was one of the first cruising vessels to reach Crimea in years. However with its call to port, it was criticized that it was violating the European Union's sanctions on Crimea.

During 2015, Lambros reported that cruises were down from the previous year in the Greek isles noting that the financial economy in Greece has weakened the cruise liners activity and cruises would continue to shrink in the Mediterranean Sea.

Fleet

Current Fleet

Former Fleet

See also
 List of cruise lines

References

Cruise lines
Shipping companies of Greece
Companies based in Athens